Dendrocerus conwentziae is a species of Megaspilid wasp in the family Megaspilidae. It occurs in North America from southern Mexico to southern Canada.

References

Parasitic wasps
Ceraphronoidea
Hymenoptera of North America
Insects described in 1919
Taxa named by Arthur Burton Gahan
Articles created by Qbugbot